The Maryland county executive elections of 2010 were held on November 2, 2010. Anne Arundel County, Baltimore County, Harford County, Howard County, Montgomery County, Prince George's County, and Wicomico County elected county executives.  This race coincided with the election for Maryland county offices elections, 2010.

Anne Arundel County

Candidates

Republican
John Leopold, incumbent County Executive and former Maryland State Delegate

Democratic
Joanna Conti, former Colorado congressional candidate and businesswoman

Green
Mike Shay

Results

Baltimore County
Incumbent County Executive James T. Smith is prevented from seeking a third term due to term limits, creating an open seat.

Candidates

Democratic
Kevin B. Kamenetz, Baltimore County Councilman

Republican
Kenneth C. Holt, former Maryland State Delegate

Results

Harford County

Candidates

Republicans
David R. Craig, incumbent County Executive, former Maryland State Senator, former Maryland State Delegate, former Mayor of Havre de Grace

Constitution
Mark Fisher

Results

Howard County

Candidates

Democratic
Kenneth Ulman, incumbent County Executive, former Howard County Councilman

Republicans
Trent Kittleman

Montgomery County

Candidates

Democrat
Isiah Leggett, incumbent County Executive, former Montgomery County Councilman, former Chairman of the Maryland Democratic Party

Republican
Douglas E. Rosenfeld

Prince George's County
The current County Executive, Democrat Jack B. Johnson, was precluded from seeking a third term by term limits.

Candidates

Democrats
Rushern Baker, former Maryland State Delegate
Michael A. Jackson, former Prince George's County Sheriff
Samuel Dean, Prince George's County Councilman
Gerron Levi, Maryland State Delegate
Henry C. Turner, Jr., businessman

Primary election results

General election results

Wicomico County

Candidates

Democratic
Rick Pollitt, incumbent County Executive and former Fruitland, MD City Manager
Tom Taylor
John W. Baker

Republicans
Joe Ollinger

Primary results

General election results

References

See also

County executives
Maryland county executives